Kirkwood may refer to:

Locations

Antarctica
Kirkwood Islands, string of islands near Antarctica
Kirkwood Range, massive coastal mountain chain in Antarctica
Mount Kirkwood, mountain in Antarctica

Australia 

 Kirkwood, Queensland, a locality in the Gladstone Region

Canada
Kirkwood, New Brunswick, Canada

South Africa
Kirkwood, Eastern Cape, a town in South Africa

United Kingdom
Kirkwood, Coatbridge, a neighbourhood in Coatbridge, Scotland
Kirkwood Estate, East Ayrshire, in Scotland

United States
Kirkwood, California, in Alpine and Amador Counties in the state of California
Kirkwood, Glenn County, California, in Glenn County in the state of California
Kirkwood Mountain Resort, mountain resort in the state of California
Kirkwood, Delaware, in the state of Delaware
Kirkwood (Atlanta), in the city of Atlanta, in the state of Georgia
Kirkwood, Illinois, in the state of Illinois
Kirkwood, Kansas
Kirkwood, Missouri, in the state of Missouri
Kirkwood, New Jersey, in the state of New Jersey
Kirkwood, New York, in the state of New York
Kirkwood, Ohio, in the state of Ohio
Kirkwood Township, Belmont County, Ohio, one of 16 townships of Belmont County in the state of Ohio
Kirkwood, Pennsylvania, in the state of Pennsylvania
Kirkwood, West Virginia, an unincorporated community

Structures
Kirkwood (Eutaw, Alabama), historic house in Eutaw, in the US state of Alabama
Kirkwood Building, historic building (1920) in Kansas City, in the US state of Missouri
Kirkwood Community College, post-secondary public educational institution in Cedar Rapids, in the US state of Iowa
Kirkwood High School, secondary public school in Kirkwood, Missouri
Kirkwood Hospice, palliative-care facility in Huddersfield, West Yorkshire
Kirkwood Observatory, astronomical observatory near Bloomington, in the US state of Indiana
Kirkwood station (disambiguation), stations of the name
Hotel Kirkwood, historic structure in Des Moines, in the US state of Iowa
Joseph Kirkwood House, historic dwelling in Bridgeport, in the US state of Ohio

Other uses
 Kirkwood (surname), a surname
 Kirkwood Otey (1832-1897), soldier in the Confederate Army during the US Civil Way 
 Baron Kirkwood, a title in the Peerage of the United Kingdom
 Kirkwood approximation, a mathematical superposition approximation introduced by Matsuda in 2000
 Kirkwood City Council shooting, a 2008 tragedy in Kirkwood, Missouri
 Kirkwood-Cohansey aquifer, an aquifer in the US state of New Jersey
 Kirkwood (crater), a crater on the far side of Earth's Moon
 Kirkwood Formation, a geologic feature in South Africa
 Kirkwood gap, an observed gap in the main asteroid belt
 Kirkwood Mall, an enclosed shopping center in Bismarck, in the US state of North Dakota
 Kirkwood Highway, part of Delaware Route 2 in the US state of Delaware
 Kirkwood, a System on a chip by Marvell Technology Group used in plug computers
 1578 Kirkwood, an asteroid that was discovered in 1951